"Don't Stop" is a song by Australian boy band CDB, released in March 1996 as the fourth and final single from their debut studio album, Glide with Me (1995). The song peaked at number 28 on the ARIA Charts.

Track listing
'''CD single (661108 2)
 "Don't Stop" – 3:44
 "Let's Groove"  (Summer Groove)  – 5:05
 "Hook Me Up"  (Wicked Mix)  – 4:17
 "Hey Girl (This Is Our Time)"  (Sentimental Mix)  – 3:53
 "Don't Stop"  (Remix)  – 2:19

Charts

References

1996 singles
CDB (band) songs
1995 songs
Sony Music Australia singles
Songs written by Gary Pinto
Songs written by Andrew De Silva